Leden is a surname. Notable people with the surname include:

 Christian Leden (1882–1957), Norwegian ethno-musicologist and composer
 Gijs van der Leden (born 1967), Dutch water polo player
 Judy Leden (born 1959), British hang glider and paraglider pilot

See also
 Ledin